The 2013–14 UEFA Women's Champions League was the 13th edition of the European women's championship for football clubs. The final was held at Estádio do Restelo, Lisbon, Portugal.

German team VfL Wolfsburg won the title over Swedish club Tyresö FF after turning a 0–2 into a 4–3 win. Wolfsburg became the third side to defend the Champions League title.

Team allocation and distribution
Austria had overtaken Norway for 8th place in the UEFA coefficient ranking and thus assured themselves a second entry.

Countries were allocated places according to their UEFA league coefficient for women. Here CH denotes the national champion, RU the national runner-up, Ned 1 and Bel 1 the best placed Belgian and Dutch team in their joint league.

54 teams entered the competition, with KÍ Klaksvík retaining their record being the only team to play all editions of the UEFA Women's Cup and Women's Champions League so far.

Round and draw dates
UEFA has scheduled the competition as follows.

Qualifying round

Seeding and draw
32 teams entered in the qualifying round, and were divided into eight groups of four teams, with one team from each seeding pot. Host countries won't be drawn together.

Pot 1
  Glasgow City
  Unia Racibórz
  Zürich
  PAOK
  Apollon Limassol (host)
  Olimpia Cluj (host)
  MTK
  SFK 2000 (host)

Pot 2
  PK-35 Vantaa (host)
  Zhytlobud-1 Kharkiv
  Spartak Subotica
  Twente (host)
  NSA Sofia
  ASA Tel Aviv University
  Babruichanka Babruisk
  KÍ Klaksvík

Pot 3
  Osijek
  Gintra Universitetas
  Pomurje (host)
  Raheny United
  Atlético Ouriense (host)
  Cardiff City
  Nové Zámky
  Pärnu JK

Pot 4
  Biljanini Izvori
  Konak Belediyesi
  Crusaders Strikers (host)
  Goliador Chişinău
  Ada
  Birkirkara
  Ekonomist
  Liepājas Metalurgs

Groups were played as mini tournaments over a span of six days.

Group 1

Group 2

Group 3

Group 4

Group 5

Group 6

Group 7

Group 8

Ranking of group runners-up
The two best runners-up also qualify for the round of 32. The match against the fourth-placed team in the group does not count for the purposes of the runners-up table. The tie-breakers in this ranking are:

 Higher number of points obtained
 Superior goal difference
 Higher number of goals scored
 Higher number of club coefficient points
 Fair play conduct in all group matches

Knockout phase
22 teams enter the competition in the round of 32. They are joined by ten teams from the qualifying round. Teams marked (Q) advanced from qualifying.

Seeded:
  Lyon
  Turbine Potsdam
  Arsenal
  Rossiyanka
  Torres
  Wolfsburg
  Brøndby
  LdB Malmö
  Sparta Praha
  Fortuna Hjørring
  Paris
  Neulengbach
  Zorkiy Krasnogorsk
  Glasgow City (Q)
  Birmingham City
  Unia Racibórz (Q)

Unseeded:
  Tyresö
  Zürich (Q)
  Standard Liège
  Apollon Limassol (Q)
  Tavagnacco
  CSHVSM Kairat
  MTK (Q)
  Barcelona
  Lillestrøm SK
  PK-35 Vantaa (Q)
  Thór/KA
  Spratzern
  Twente (Q)
  Spartak Subotica (Q)
  Pärnu JK (Q)
  Konak Belediyesi (Q)

Bracket

Round of 32
The round of 32 and round of 16 was drawn on 5 September 2013. Teams from the same association or qualifying group couldn't be drawn together. Seeded teams played the second leg at home. Teams are awarded 20,000 Euro for both legs. A sum criticized to be too small by team managers, leaving teams like Arsenal who have to fly by plane with financial losses.

First leg

Second leg

Torres won 5–3 on aggregate.

Birmingham City won 4–0 on aggregate.

Zorkiy Krasnogorsk won 6–2 on aggregate.

Wolfsburg won 27–0 on aggregate.

Fortuna Hjørring won 4–3 on aggregate.

2–2 on aggregate. Barcelona won on away goals.

LdB Malmö won 8–1 on aggregate.

Lyon won 10–0 on aggregate.

Neulengbach won 3–2 on aggregate.

Turbine Potsdam won 11–0 on aggregate.

Zürich won 3–2 on aggregate.

Tyresö won 2–1 on aggregate.

Rossiyanka won 5–3 on aggregate.

Konak Belediyesi won 2–1 on aggregate.

Arsenal won 18–2 on aggregate.

Glasgow City won 5–3 on aggregate.

Round of 16

First leg

Second leg

Wolfsburg won 5–2 on aggregate.

Barcelona won 6–1 on aggregate.

Arsenal won 6–2 on aggregate.

Birmingham City won 7–2 on aggregate.

Torres won 2–1 on aggregate.

Neulengbach won 6–0 on aggregate.

Tyresö won 6–1 on aggregate.

2–2 on aggregate. Turbine Potsdam won on away goals.

Quarter-finals
An open draw for the quarterfinals and the following rounds on was held 21 November 2013. Matches were played on 22/23 and 29/30 March 2014.

Notes

First leg

Second leg

Tyresö won 8–1 on aggregate.

Wolfsburg won 5–0 on aggregate.

Potsdam won 12–1 on aggregate.

Birmingham won 3–0 on aggregate.

Semi-finals
Matches were played on 19 and 27 April 2014.

First leg

Second leg

Tyresö won 3–0 on aggregate.

Wolfsburg won 4–2 on aggregate.

Final

Statistics
The top scorer award includes the qualifying round. Milena Nikolić of Spartak Subotica won that with eleven goals.

The following statistics exclude qualifying round.

Top goalscorers

Top assists

References

External links
Official website

 
Women's
UEFA Women's Champions League seasons
UEFA
UEFA